Mulinuyuq (Quechua mulinu mill or swirl (a borrowing from Spanish molino or remolino), -yuq a suffix to indicate ownership, "the one with a mill (or mills)" or "the one with a swirl (or swirls)", also spelled Molinoyoc) is an archaeological site in the Ayacucho Region in Peru. It is located in the Huanta Province.

References 

Archaeological sites in Peru
Archaeological sites in Ayacucho Region